Schönenberger is a surname. Notable people with the surname include:

 Christian Schönenberger (born 1956), Swiss experimental physicist 
 Mario Schönenberger (born 1986), Swiss footballer
 Urs Schönenberger (born 1959), Swiss footballer

See also
 Schönenberg (disambiguation)